Czuszów  is a village in the administrative district of Gmina Pałecznica, within Proszowice County, Lesser Poland Voivodeship, in southern Poland.

The village has a population of 706.

References

Villages in Proszowice County